Sophiane Baghdad (born 10 September 1980) is a former professional footballer who played as a midfielder. Born in Monaco, he holds both Algerian and French citizenship.

References

1980 births
Living people
Monegasque expatriate footballers
Monegasque footballers
Algerian footballers
Oud-Heverlee Leuven players
AS Beauvais Oise players
CS Sedan Ardennes players
Ligue 2 players
K.S.K. Beveren players
R. Olympic Charleroi Châtelet Farciennes players
Royale Union Saint-Gilloise players
Challenger Pro League players
Algerian expatriate footballers
Algerian expatriate sportspeople in France
Expatriate footballers in France
Algerian expatriate sportspeople in Belgium
Expatriate footballers in Belgium
People with acquired French citizenship
Association football forwards
21st-century Algerian people